Thysanotus dichotomus is a herb in the Asparagaceae family, endemic to Western Australia, and first described in 1805 by Jacques Labillardière as Ornithogalum dichotomum. In 1810, Robert Brown transferred it to the genus, Thysanotus.

References 

Asparagales of Australia
Flora of Western Australia
Lomandroideae